Love Life Peace is the fourth studio album by Italian singer and pianist Raphael Gualazzi. It was released in Italy through Sugar Music on the 23 September 2016. The album reached number 4 on the Italian Albums Chart. The album includes the singles "L'estate di John Wayne" and "Lotta Things".

Singles
"L'estate di John Wayne" was released as the lead single from the album on 15 July 2016. The song peaked at number 43 on the Italian Singles Chart. "Lotta Things" was released as the second single from the album on 30 October 2016. "Buena fortuna" was released as the third single from the album on 24 February 2017.

Track listing

Standard listing

Charts and certifications

Weekly charts

Certifications

Release history

References

2016 albums
Raphael Gualazzi albums